Santiago  was a Spanish territory of the Spanish West Indies and within the Viceroyalty of New Spain, in the Caribbean region. Its location is the present-day island and nation of Jamaica.

Pre-Columbian Jamaica 

Around 650 AD, Jamaica was colonized by the people of the Ostionoid culture, who likely came from South America.  Alligator Pond in Manchester Parish and Little River in St. Ann Parish are among the earliest known sites of this Ostionoid people, who lived near the coast and extensively hunted turtles and fish.

Around 950 AD, the people of the Meillacan culture settled on both the coast and the interior of Jamaica, either absorbing the Ostionoid people or co-inhabiting the island with them.

The Taíno culture developed on Jamaica around 1200 AD. They brought from South America a system of raising yuca known as "conuco." To add nutrients to the soil, the Taíno burned local bushes and trees and heaped the ash into large mounds, into which they then planted yuca cuttings. Most Taíno lived in large circular buildings (bohios), constructed with wooden poles, woven straw, and palm leaves. The Taino spoke an Arawakan language and did not have writing. Some of the words used by them, such as barbacoa ("barbecue"), hamaca ("hammock"), kanoa ("canoe"), tabaco ("tobacco"), yuca, batata ("sweet potato"), and juracán ("hurricane"), have been incorporated into Spanish and English.

Columbus 

Christopher Columbus set sail on his second voyage to the Americas on September 24, 1493. On November 3, 1493, he landed on an island that he named Dominica. On November 22, he landed on Hispaniola and spent some time exploring the interior of the island for gold. He left Hispaniola on April 24, 1494, and arrived at the island of Juana (Cuba) on April 30 and Jamaica on May 5. He explored the south coast of Juana before returning to Hispaniola on August 20. After staying for a time on the western end, present-day Haiti, he finally returned to Spain.

Columbus returned to Jamaica during his fourth voyage to the Americas.  He had been sailing around the Caribbean nearly a year when a storm beached his ships in St. Ann's Bay, Jamaica, on June 25, 1503.

For a year Columbus and his men remained stranded on Jamaica. A Spaniard, Diego Mendez, and some natives paddled a canoe to get help from Hispaniola. The island's governor, Nicolás de Ovando y Cáceres, detested Columbus and obstructed all efforts to rescue him and his men. In the meantime, Columbus allegedly mesmerized the natives by correctly predicting a lunar eclipse for February 29, 1504, using the Ephemeris of the German astronomer Regiomontanus. Help finally arrived, from the governor, on June 29, 1504, and Columbus and his men arrived in Sanlúcar de Barrameda, Castile, on November 7, 1504.

New Seville  

The Spanish Empire began its official governance of Jamaica in 1509. That year, Columbus's son, Diego Columbus, instructed conquistador Juan de Esquivel to formally occupy Jamaica in his name. Esquivel had accompanied Columbus in his second trip to the Americas in 1493 and participated in the invasion of Hispaniola.  A decade later, Friar Bartolomé de las Casas wrote Spanish authorities about Esquivel's conduct during the Higüey massacre of 1503.

The first Spanish settlement was founded in 1509 near St Ann's Bay and named Sevilla la Nueva, or New Seville.

St Jago de la Vega 

In 1534 the settlers moved to a new, healthier site, which they named Villa de la Vega, and later St Jago de la Vega, which the English renamed Spanish Town when they conquered the island in 1655. This settlement served as the capital of both Spanish and English Jamaica from its foundation in 1534 until 1872, after which the capital was moved to Kingston.

Other settlements established by the Spanish included Esquivel (now Old Harbour Bay, Jamaica), Oristan (Bluefields, Jamaica), Savanna-la-Mar, Manterias (Montego Bay), Las Chorreras (Ocho Rios), Oracabeza (Oracabessa), Puerto Santa Maria (Port Maria), Mellila (Annotto Bay) and Puerto Anton (Port Antonio).

In 1611, the population of Spanish Jamaica was 1,510, including 696 Spaniards, 107 free people of color, 74 Tainos, 558 black slaves, and 75 "foreigners". However, that census did not include the Taino who fled to the mountainous interior, where they mingled with freed African slaves, and became the ancestors to the Jamaican Maroons of Nanny Town.

The Spaniards enslaved many of the native people, overworking and harming them to the point that many had perished within fifty years of European arrival. Subsequently, the lack of indigenous opportunity for labour was mended with the arrival of African slaves. Disappointed in the lack of gold on the isle, the Spanish mainly used Jamaica as a military base to supply colonizing efforts in the mainland Americas.

The Spanish colonists did not bring women in the first expeditions and took Taíno women for their common-law wives, resulting in mestizo children. Sexual violence with the Taíno women by the Spanish was also common.

Although the Taino referred to the island as "Xaymaca," the Spanish gradually changed the name to "Jamaica." In the so-called Admiral's map of 1507 the island was labeled as "Jamaiqua" and in Peter Martyr's work "Decades" of 1511, he referred to it as both "Jamaica" and "Jamica."

In 1597, English privateer Anthony Shirley landed on Jamaica and plundered the island, marching on St Jago de la Vega with the help of a Taino guide, and he sacked the town. Governor Fernando Melgarejo tried to protect the island from pirate raids, and in 1603 he successfully repelled an attack by Christopher Newport.

In 1643, William Jackson (pirate) landed at Caguaya, marched on St Jago de la Vega, and plundered it.

English conquest

In late 1654, English leader Oliver Cromwell launched the Western Design armada against Spain's colonies in the Caribbean.  In April 1655, General Robert Venables led the armada in an attack on Spain's fort at Santo Domingo, Hispaniola. However, the Spanish repulsed this poorly-executed attack, known as the Siege of Santo Domingo, and the English troops were soon decimated by disease.  

Weakened by fever and looking for an easy victory following their defeat at Santo Domingo, the English force then sailed for Jamaica, the only Spanish West Indies island that did not have new defensive works. In May 1655, around 7,000 English soldiers landed near Jamaica's Spanish Town capital.  The English invasion force soon overwhelmed the small number of Spanish troops (at the time, Jamaica's entire population only numbered around 2,500).

In the following years, Spain repeatedly attempted to recapture Jamaica, and in response in 1657 the English Governor of Jamaica invited buccaneers to base themselves at Port Royal, to help defend against Spanish attacks. Spain never recaptured Jamaica, losing the Battle of Ocho Rios in 1657 and the Battle of Rio Nuevo in 1658. When the Spanish Maroon leader, Juan de Bolas, switched sides and joined the English, the Spanish acting governor Ysasi conceded defeat in his attempts to reconquer the island. For England, the Colony of Jamaica was to be the "dagger pointed at the heart of the Spanish Empire", although in fact it was a possession of little economic value then.

See also

 History of Jamaica
 Jamaicans of Spanish descent
 Spanish colonization of the Americas
 Spanish Governors of Santiago

References

Sources

 
 
 
 

 
1509 establishments in the Colony of Santiago
Former Spanish colonies
Former colonies in North America
Former countries in the Caribbean
History of Jamaica
1655 disestablishments in the Colony of Santiago
Spanish-speaking countries and territories
States and territories established in 1509
Spanish West Indies